Harrisonville may refer to:

Harrisonville, Georgia, an unincorporated community
Harrisonville, Missouri, Missouri, a city in Cass County, Missouri
Harrisonville, Illinois, a small unincorporated community in the historic Harrisonville Precinct of Monroe County, Illinois
Harrisonville, Indiana, a ghost town in Tippecanoe County
Harrisonville, Kentucky, an unincorporated community
Harrisonville, Ohio, an unincorporated community
Harrisonville, Pennsylvania,  in Licking Creek Township, Fulton County, Pennsylvania
Harrisonville, New Jersey, an unincorporated area located within South Harrison Township in Gloucester County, New Jersey
Battle Ground, Indiana, formed in part from the 1867 consolidation with the Town of Harrisonville
Harrisonville Telephone Company, founded in Waterloo, Illinois